Karkodeswarar temple, Kamarasavalli is a Hindu temple located at Kamarasavalli near Thirumanur in Ariyalur district of Tamil Nadu, India.

The Presiding deity
The presiding deity known as Karkodeswarar is facing east. His consort Balambika is facing south.

Significance 
The temple has a sculpture in which Kardodaga is seen performing puja for Shiva, with Vinayaka and Nandi (bull).  It is said that people of the Cancer zodiac sign should pray here for relief.

Shrines
In the Prakaram, shrines of Vinayaka, Subramania with his consorts Valli and Deivanai, Durga, Chandikesvarar and Navagraha are found. In the kosta, Dakshinamurthy, Ardhanarishvara, Lingodbhava and Brahma are found. The temple has a mandapa for Nataraja.

References

Photogallery

Sculptures

Shiva temples in Ariyalur district